The canton of Châtellerault-2 is an administrative division of the Vienne department, western France. It was created at the French canton reorganisation which came into effect in March 2015. Its seat is in Châtellerault.

It consists of the following communes:
 
Antran
Buxeuil
Châtellerault (partly)
Dangé-Saint-Romain
Ingrandes
Leigné-sur-Usseau
Leugny
Mondion
Orches
Les Ormes
Oyré
Port-de-Piles
Saint-Christophe
Saint-Gervais-les-Trois-Clochers
Saint-Rémy-sur-Creuse
Savigny-sous-Faye
Sérigny
Sossais
Usseau
Vaux-sur-Vienne
Vellèches

References

Cantons of Vienne